"Holiday" is a song by British YouTuber and rapper KSI, from his second studio album, All Over the Place (2021). It was written by KSI, alongside its producers Jake Gosling, Digital Farm Animals and William Vaughan. The song was released for digital download and streaming by RBC Records and BMG on 18 June 2021 as the fourth single from the album. An accompanying music video was released on the same day. "Holiday" is a folk-tinged, midtempo pop song which reflects on the honeymoon period of a relationship.

"Holiday" debuted at number two on the UK Singles Chart and it has been certified platinum by the British Phonographic Industry (BPI) for exceeding sales of 600,000 units in the UK. The song additionally entered the music charts of Australia, Canada, Denmark, Iceland, India, Lithuania, the Netherlands, New Zealand, Norway, the Republic of Ireland, Singapore, Sweden & the United States. "Holiday" was nominated for the BRIT Award for Song of the Year at the 2022 ceremony.

Critical reception 
Rob Copsey of the Official Charts Company described the song as a reflection "on the honeymoon period of a relationship" and a "hopeful, folk-tinged midtempo" track.

Commercial performance 
The song debuted at number two on the UK Singles Chart dated 25 June 2021, making it the highest-placed new entry of that week and his 7th top ten hit.

Track listing

Awards and nominations

Credits and personnel 
Credits adapted from Tidal.

 KSIsongwriting, vocals, hand clap
 Jake Goslingproduction, songwriting, drums, keyboard, hand clap, percussion, programming
Digital Farm Animalssongwriting, backing vocals, hand clap, percussion
 William Vaughansongwriting, electric guitar
 Matthew Brettledrums, guitar, percussion, programming, engineering
 Geoff Swanengineering
 Niko Battistiniengineering
 Joe LaPortaengineering

Charts

Weekly charts

Year-end charts

Certifications

Release history

References 

2021 songs
2021 singles
KSI songs
Songs written by KSI
Songs written by Jake Gosling
Songs written by Digital Farm Animals
Song recordings produced by Jake Gosling
RBC Records singles
BMG Rights Management singles